"Doctor Pepper" is a song recorded by American music producer Diplo, South Korean recording artist CL and American rappers Riff Raff and OG Maco. It was released on May 26, 2015 by Mad Decent. Produced by Diplo and Swizzymack, "Doctor Pepper" is a trap song. CL later stated she wrote the lyrics after Diplo cancelled their recording session, making her write the song in a rush while drinking a can of Dr. Pepper. 
An accompanying music video was shot in Las Vegas.

Track listings and formats

Digital download
"Doctor Pepper" – 3:46

Credits and personnel
Personnel
Diplo – producer
CL – vocals, songwriter
Riff Raff – vocals, songwriter
OG Maco – vocals, songwriter
Swizzymack - Producer

Release history

References

External links
 

2015 singles
2015 songs
Songs written by Diplo
Song recordings produced by Diplo